Carolina Kopelioff (born August 30, 1996 in Buenos Aires) is an Argentine actress, singer and model, known for the role of Nina Simonetti in the Disney Channel series Soy Luna.

Biography 
She began her career at age 18 when she landed the role of Nina Simonetti in the telenovela Disney series Soy Luna along with Karol Sevilla, Valentina Zenere and Agustin Bernasconi.

Filmography

Award 
 Best actress in the Nickelodeon Kids' Choice Awards Argentina.

References 

1996 births
People from Buenos Aires
Argentine actresses
Living people